Çomaxtur (also, Chomakhtur) is a village and municipality in the Sharur District of Nakhchivan Autonomous Republic, Azerbaijan. It is located 1 km in the south-west from the district center, on the Sharur plain. Its population is busy with grain-growing, vegetable-growing, foddering, vine-growing animal husbandry. There are secondary school, cultural house, library and a medical center in the village. It has a population of 3,117.

Etymology
It have been noted in Çomaxdur (Chomakhdur) and Çamaxtur (Chamakhtur) versions, too. Apparently, the original name was Çamaxdar (Chamakhdar) şadaracı and means "riddle".

Population  
 Tagi Ismailov
 Javid Ismayil

References 

Populated places in Sharur District